Bruno Rodrigo Fenelon Palomo (born 12 April 1985), known as Bruno Rodrigo, is a Brazilian footballer who plays as a central defender for Grêmio.

Career
Born in São Paulo, Bruno Rodrigo started his professional career in his hometown, playing for Portuguesa. In December 2009, he moved to Santos.

Statistics

Honours
Portuguesa
Campeonato Paulista Série A2: 2007

Santos
Campeonato Paulista: 2010, 2011, 2012
Copa do Brasil: 2010
Copa Libertadores: 2011
Recopa Sudamericana: 2012

Cruzeiro
Campeonato Brasileiro Série A: 2013, 2014
Campeonato Mineiro: 2014

Grêmio
Copa Libertadores: 2017

References

External links

1985 births
Living people
Footballers from São Paulo
Brazilian footballers
Association football defenders
Campeonato Brasileiro Série A players
Campeonato Brasileiro Série B players
Associação Portuguesa de Desportos players
Santos FC players
Cruzeiro Esporte Clube players
Grêmio Foot-Ball Porto Alegrense players